Frank Robert Falconer (January 25, 1883 – August 1970) was a provincial politician from Alberta, Canada. He served as a member of the Legislative Assembly of Alberta from 1930 to 1935 sitting with the Liberal caucus in opposition.

Political career
Falconer ran for a seat to the Alberta Legislature in the 1930 Alberta general election as a Liberal candidate in the electoral district of Athabasca. He defeated incumbent John Frame in a closely contested race.

Falconer ran for a second term in the 1935 Alberta general election. He was defeated by Social Credit candidate Clarence Tade finishing second in the field of three candidates.

References

External links
Legislative Assembly of Alberta Members Listing

Alberta Liberal Party MLAs
1970 deaths
1883 births